Mardalsfossen is a waterfall in Molde Municipality in Møre og Romsdal county, Norway. It is sometimes referred to as one of the tallest waterfalls in Europe. The waterfall was depicted in the coat of arms of the old Nesset Municipality.

The total fall is  according to SSB,  according to World Waterfall Database (WWD). WWD reports that the SSB typically includes the head measurement for waterfalls that are situated within a hydroelectric system, resulting in a greater height estimate. Mardalsfossen is a tiered waterfall consisting of two large drops and several smaller ones lower down. The highest vertical drop is one of the tallest in Norway. As with figures for the total height, discrepancies have been reported in the estimated height of each vertical drop.

The water, which has been tapped for hydroelectric use, flows over the falls during the summer tourist season of 20 June to 20 August. At other times the water is channeled through the hydroelectric scheme.

In 1970 Arne Næss, the Norwegian founder of the Deep Ecology movement, tied himself with 300 others in protest against the building of a dam and the subsequent removal of the waterfall.

Between June 2014 and August 2015 Antony Gormley’s Another Time was on view in the mist from the waterfall and formed the official start of the Mardalsfossen Art Project.

Name
The first element is from the name of the valley Mardalen and the last element is the finite form of foss which means "waterfall". The name of the valley is a compound of an old river name Mara (now Mardøla) and the finite form of dal which means "dale" or "valley". The old name of the river is probably derived from the verb mara which means "rub", "grave", "dig" or "die."

Gallery

References

Molde
Waterfalls of Møre og Romsdal